Cerithiella enodis is a species of very small sea snail, a marine gastropod mollusk in the family Newtoniellidae. This species is known from European waters. It was described by Watson in 1880.

Description 

Habitat 

References

Newtoniellidae
Gastropods described in 1880